Kristin Richardson Jordan (born January 3, 1987) is an American politician who is the Council member for New York City's 9th City Council district. Jordan identifies as a democratic socialist and police abolitionist. In her 2021 race for the New York City Council, she campaigned on a platform of "radical love."

Early life and education
Jordan was born in Baltimore, Maryland, in 1987 to physicians Lynne D. Richardson and Desmond Jordan. Her parents were both raised in Harlem, and the family returned after her father's internship at Johns Hopkins University, where she grew up. She graduated from the Calhoun School and then from Brown University in 2009, double-majoring in Africana studies and literary arts. 

Jordan is a published poet, a reform activist, and a lesbian.

Career
Jordan ran for New York City Council in 2021 against incumbent Council member Bill Perkins, narrowly defeating him in the Democratic primary, virtually assuring her election in the overwhelmingly Democratic district.

A member of the Democratic Socialists of America, Jordan was not endorsed by that organization, as it wanted to focus support on other candidates in that year's elections. Members of her campaign have also speculated that the DSA may have been dissatisfied with her past membership in the Party for Socialism and Liberation.

Controversies
Jordan was criticized in the aftermath of a fatal shooting in her district where two Latino NYPD police officers, Jason Rivera and Wilbert Mora were shot and killed in a domestic disturbance call; choosing instead to issue tweets about a local community garden. After criticism by residents, she stated she was told not to tweet about the slain officers. Several days later, she publicly sent condolences to the family of Lashawn McNeil, the alleged killer who was shot and killed by a third officer, alongside the families of the fallen cops. Explaining her motivation, Jordan stated "I mourn the loss of literally all human life. I don’t see it as contradictory to mourn the life lost of Lashawn as well as the lives of Officer Rivera and Officer Mora."

In February 2022, Jordan received criticism for justifying the 2022 Russian invasion of Ukraine by claiming that the Revolution of Dignity was a coup led by the United States, European Union, and NATO. She said, "In 2014, the U.S. helped overthrow Ukraine’s democratically elected leader in an illegal coup, helped install a fascist government and empowered a far right military all with the goal of destabilizing Russia."

In summer 2022, Jordan helped block a 1000 unit housing development which would have consisted of 50% affordable housing and a civil rights museum. Jordan's rationale was that said "what they're calling affordable is [not] actually affordable to the community," as only 12% of the units were earmarked for individuals earning 30% of the area median income. Jordan said she would only support projects where more than half of all units were earmarked for individuals earning less than 30% of New York median income. After the developer, Bruce Teitelbaum, agreed to make half the units affordable, Jordan asked for 100% affordable units, which was refused. Instead, a large truck depot was built and opened in December of 2022.

References

1987 births
Living people
Activists from New York City
Poets from New York (state)
New York (state) Democrats
New York (state) socialists
21st-century American politicians
21st-century American women politicians
Democratic Socialists of America politicians from New York
Party for Socialism and Liberation politicians
Brown University alumni
African-American activists
21st-century African-American women
21st-century African-American politicians
20th-century African-American people
American LGBT city council members
20th-century African-American women
Women New York City Council members
New York City Council members
Queer women